The Portugal national rugby league team (nicknamed the Roosters) is the national rugby league team of Portugal. The captain of the team is Parramatta Eels' hooker, Isaac de Gois and their coach is Mal Speers.

History

2000s
The Portuguese Rugby League Association (PRLA) was established in January 2005. Based in Marrickville, Sydney, Australia, the founder of the PRLA is an Australian born rugby league supporter, who married into a Portuguese family.

The first meeting of the PRLA was held at the Henson Park Hotel on early September 2005 and was attended by players who would form the nucleus of the team for the first match.

Portugal's first match was played against Fiji A, one month later, at Granville Park, on 8 October 2005, as part of the Fiji National Day Celebrations.

The team was captained by Isaac de Gois, featuring his brothers Eric and Aaron, as well as their cousin, Fábio de Gois. Born in Madeira, Fábio was playing his first match of rugby league.

Ivan Pacho has the honour of scoring Portugal's first try, in a 40–4 loss.

In 2006, the PRLA entered the team in two sevens tournaments (VB Sevens @ St Marys and the Illawarra Sevens in Wollongong) as well as accepting an offer to play against touring teams from Britain (Great Britain Armed Forces and the British Royal Armoured Corps).

In 2007, Portugal's featured in the VB Sevens at St Marys in February and in October, an International friendly against Malta.

In April 2007, PRLA Executive met with the officials from the Portuguese Rugby Union, who were in Australia for the IRB World Sevens Rugby Tournament. The meeting proved fruitful, with a sporting alliance being established between the two codes.

In February 2008, Portugal competed in the Cabramatta International Nines and the Illawarra Sevens as well as an International friendly against Japan in Sydney.

In October 2009, Portugal took on Malta in the Mediterranean Shield. Portugal would suffer their biggest defeat up to date, losing the match 64–6.

2010s
In 2012, Portugal played in the Cabramatta International Nines tournament. In 2013, Portugal played another International friendly against Japan in Sydney. Portugal won the match in a tight 26-20 result, also withstanding a late Japanese attacking effort on the hooter.

Future plans
The PRLA has set a Development program for rugby league players aged 14 to 16. The program is aimed at identifying Portuguese rugby league players and providing them with an opportunity to play rugby league for Portugal in Junior Rugby League matches and tournaments.

In Australia, participation in sevens tournaments and international matches against local and touring teams during the rugby league off-season, from October to February.

Overseas, development opportunities in Portugal and other Portuguese communities, worldwide. Plans are underway for an overseas rugby league tour to South Africa in 2010. This tour will see rugby league/union players from Australia, France and Portugal come together for the historic tour. They will be joined by players from South Africa. It is expected this tour will be in May 2010.

There are also other options for the Portuguese Rugby League, including future tournaments in Portugal before heading to Italy for their annual Nines tournament.

Participation in future rugby league World Cup qualifiers will occur once the rugby league is established in Portugal. Portugal will be part of the European Division in World Cup Rugby League qualifiers.

Players

Current squad

2012 Cabramatta International Nines squad
1. Aaron Gomes
3.Carlos Ramos
4.Justin Camacho
5.Luis Camacho
6.Gabriel Ramon  (c)
7.Blake Austin
8.Greg Rodrigue
9.Robert Gomes
19.Matt Bateman
11.James Harriman
12.Josh Head
13.Wade Graham
14.Marcious Ramos
15.Bento Nunes
16.Chris Chevis
17. Wayne Dargan
18.Sonny Masae
19. Ben De Brito
Coach/Manager: Mal Speers
Trainer: Victor Penitani
v Cook Islands  4-24
v Vanuatu  4-40
v Philippines  0-20

Results and fixtures
Below are the previous 10 matches of the national team. For all past match results, see the team's results page.

Latin Heat defeated Portugal 40–6, October 19, 2014
Portugal defeated Japan 26–20, January 31, 2013
Malta defeated Portugal 62–6, October 17, 2009
Greece defeated Portugal 42–16, October 10, 2009
Portugal defeated Cumberland Beavers 34–4, November 1, 2008
Portugal defeated Japan 28–16, February 6, 2008
Malta defeated Portugal 56–12,  October 6, 2007
British Royal Armoured Corps  defeated Portugal 17–8, October 12, 2006
Great Britain Armed Forces defeated Portugal 66–6, April 21, 2006
Fiji defeated Portugal 40 - 4, October 8, 2005

See also

List of Portugal national rugby league team players

References

External links
The Portuguese Rugby League Association
Report of the First Match

National rugby league teams
Rugby league in Portugal
R